i-CABLE News Channel is a Cantonese cable news channel in Hong Kong. It is the first 24-hour television news service in Hong Kong and Asia.

The channel forms part of Cable News Hong Kong and is owned by i-CABLE News Limited, and is seen on Channel 9 (Until 23 May 2018 in SD and Channel 209 Until 7 May 2018 in HD) on Cable TV Hong Kong's channel lineup. News bulletins are presented throughout the day, including financial, weather, sport and breaking news, updated every thirty minutes.

Starts 8 May 2018 and 24 May 2018, i-Cable News Channel Was Renumbering On Channel 109 in HD and Channel 152 in SD.

History
The original Cable News Channel debuted on 31 October 1993, as part of Cable TV's launch lineup. The channel was split into two services in 1995: Cable News Channel 1 offered in-depth news analysis and business programming along with several news bulletins at various times of the day, while Cable News Channel 2 provided headline news service 24 hours a day.

On 3 January 2006, Cable News re-organised its outputs: Cable News 1 was rebranded as Cable Finance Info Channel, with a focus on business news; Cable News 2 was rebranded as the new Cable News Channel.

On 1 December 2020, the broadcaster dismissed 40 staff members with immediate effect, citing the economic impact of the COVID-19 pandemic. Several other staff members resigned in protest.

Newscasts
Current news sections are named as follows.

CABLE News (Weekdays: 00:00-07:00, 09:00-18:00, 18:15-19:00 and 21:00-21:30; Weekends: 00:00-18:00, 18:30-19:00 and 21:00-22:00)
CABLE Morning News (Cable早晨) (Mondays to Fridays: 07:00-09:00)
1230 News (午間新聞) (12:30-13:00)
Sign-Language News (手語新聞報道) (18:00-18:30)
1830 News (六點半新聞報導) (18:30-19:00)
1900 News/ 1930 News (7點直播室) (Weekdays: 19:00-20:00; Weekends & Public Holidays: 19:00-19:30)
International News (國際最前線) (20:00-21:00; 22:00-23:00)
China Beat (有線中國組) (Weeknights: 21:30-21:45)
2300 CABLE News/2330 CABLE News (晚間直播室) (Weekdays: 23:00-23:45; Weekends: 23:30-00:00)

Originally, news sections are named according to the time of day at which they are screened.

Morning Edition (Weekdays 09:00-12:00, Weekends 07:00-12:00)
Noon Edition (12:00-14:00)
Afternoon Edition (14:00-18:00)
Prime Edition (Weekdays 21:00-21:30, Weekends 21:00-22:00)
2400 News (午夜最前線) (Weeknights: 00:00-00:30; Weekends: 00:00-01:00)
Late Night Edition (深夜直播室) (01:00-04:00)
1800 News (六點新聞報導) (18:00-18:30)
2300 News (晚間最前線) (23:30-00:00)
2330 News (十一點半最前線) (23:30-00:00)

The main cast are at 19:00 (with two anchors, jointly with Hong Kong Open TV), 19:30 (with two anchors, only on Weekends), and at mid-night(00:00 with an anchor, jointly with i-Cable Family Entertainment Channel) every day. From 3 February 2020, weekdays 1900 News extend to 1 hour during the coronavirus epidemic (with two anchors, jointly with Hong Kong Open TV), 1930 News which have the same Chinese name is cancelled during weekdays.

Programs that are broadcast jointly with i-Cable Family Entertainment Channel including:

Anchors
Anchors are responsible for the casts on the channel, reporting live news daily. Some of them are the host of programmes of i-CABLE Finance Info Channel.

There has been several changes from 2020-2022

 Jolly Wong (Chief Anchor)
 Vincent Chan (Principal Anchor)
 Cheryl Yuen (Principal Anchor)
 Cherry Chan (Senior Anchor)
 Terrie Leung (Senior Anchor)
 Yanna Yu (Senior Anchor)
 Karkar Chin (Part-Time Anchor)
 Carson Leung (Anchor)
 Krystal Law (Anchor)
 Erica Lam (Anchor)

Some Reporters may also host news occasionally.

Former anchors:

 Lavender Cheung
 Joanne Yung
 Icy Cheung
 Anny Chong
 Venus Wong
 Petrina Wong
 Circle Lo
 Hedy Wong
 Jasmine Law
 Tiffany Mak
 Trista Cheng
 Eugenea Cheung
 Lizzie Chan
 Taly Yau (currently editor)
 Carman Tsang
 Kimmy Ng
 Kenix Wong
 Tracy Kwan (currently editor)

 Mei Wong
 Venus Cheung
 Kenix Lau
 Candace Ho
 Kammily Cheung
 Vicky Wong
 Mavis Wong
 Joshua Kwok
 Agnes Kwok
 Gordon Choi
 Elmo Wong
 Suey Liu
 Sinyi Lam
 Yoyo Li

References

Television stations in Hong Kong
24-hour television news channels in China
Cable television in Hong Kong
Television channels and stations established in 1993